The Mutiny of the Bounty is a 1916 Australian-New Zealand silent film directed by Raymond Longford about the mutiny aboard . It is the first known cinematic dramatisation of this story and is considered a lost film.

Longford claimed it was the first Australian film to shoot scenes at sea.

Plot
The story was structured in five acts.

Cast
George Cross as Captain Bligh
John Storm as King George III
D.L. Dalziel as Sir Joseph Banks
Wilton Power as Fletcher Christian
Reginald Collins as Midshipman Heywood
Ernesto Crosetto as Midshipman Hallett
Harry Beaumont as Mr Samuels
Charles Villiers as Burkett
Meta Taupopoki as Otoo
Mere Amohau as Mere
Ida Guildford as Mrs Heywood
Lottie Lyell as Nessy Heywood

Production
Filming took place in Rotorua, Norfolk Island and Sydney starting April 1916. The movie was partly financed by distributors Stanley Crick and Herbert Finlay in association with J.D. Williams and was described as "probably the most costly production yet made in Australia."
Māori actors played the Tahitians who greeted crew members of the Bounty. During shooting the unit came across a real life . Longford wanted to shoot some scenes on Pinchgut Island in Sydney Harbour but was refused with the authorities giving no reason.

Attempts were made to ensure the script was as historically accurate as possible and Bligh was not as demonised as he would be in later film versions of this story.

Reception

Box office
The film received good reviews and was a success at the box office. When the film was released in Sydney on 2 September 1916, it was endorsed by the education department and 2,000 school children attending the initial screening. Lottie Lyell later supervised a recut of the film for the British market.

Critical response
One reviewer described it as the best Australian film ever made.

References

External links

Copy of script and associated documentation available at National Archives of Australia (registration required)
Full text of  A Voyage to the South Sea by William Bligh
Full text of  A Narrative of The Mutiny, on Board His Majesty's Ship 'Bounty' by William Bligh

1916 films
Films set in 1789
Australian drama films
New Zealand drama films
Australian silent feature films
Australian black-and-white films
Films about HMS Bounty
Films directed by Raymond Longford
Lost Australian films
New Zealand silent films
Films shot in New Zealand
Films shot in Sydney
Films set on ships
1916 drama films
1916 lost films
Lost New Zealand films
Lost drama films
Silent drama films
Silent adventure films
1910s New Zealand films